The 1934 Iowa Hawkeyes football team represented the University of Iowa in the 1934 college football season.

Schedule

References

Iowa
Iowa Hawkeyes football seasons
Iowa Hawkeyes football